The Geração de Orpheu (Orpheus's Generation) or Grupo de Orfeu were a Portuguese literary movement, largely responsible for the introduction of Modernism to the arts and letters of Portugal through their tri-monthly publication,  (1915).

Following the lead of other European vanguard movements of the early twentieth century, and inspired by the Futurist Vladimir Maiakovsky's urgings, the poets Fernando Pessoa, Mário de Sá-Carneiro and Almada Negreiros, and the painters Amadeo de Souza-Cardoso and Guilherme de Santa-Rita formed a journal of art and literature based in Lisbon's Baixa district, with the principal aim of agitating, subverting and scandalizing the Portuguese bourgeoisie and social conventions.

Orpheu

The journal was named Orpheu after the Greek mythological character Orpheus, the musician who had to travel from the world of the living without looking back to save his wife Eurydice from Hades. This metaphor inspired the Geração de Orpheu, who aspired to not look back, to relinquish the past and focus on the future for the "edification of Portugal in the twentieth century". After emerging onto the Portuguese literary scene in 1915, the journal folded due to financial insolvency, when the father of Mário de Sá-Carneiro refused to continue sponsoring it. Only two issues were published (Jan-Feb-Mar and Apr-May-Jun, 1915). The third issue of Orpheu, already in printing proof, was lost for many years and until it was recovered and published in 1984.

After Orpheu
After the dissolution of Orpheu, the group continued to publish in other literary journals. In 1917, Portugal Futurista came out with reproductions of Santa-Rita Pintor and Souza-Cardoso, along with the posthumous Futurist poems of Sá-Carneiro and some poetry by Fernando Pessoa and his heteronym Álvaro de Campos. Among the journals that published contributions from the Grupo were: Exílio (1916), Centauro (1916), Portugal Futurista (1917), Athena (1924–1925) and Presença (1927–1940).

Prominent members of the movement 
 Amadeo de Souza-Cardoso, painter
 Almada Negreiros, writer / visual artist / choreographer
 Ângelo de Lima, writer
 António Ferro, writer
 Fernando Pessoa, writer
 Mário Saa, writer
 Mário de Sá-Carneiro, writer
 Santa-Rita Pintor, painter

References

Bibliography

 AA.VV. (1989). ORPHEU, edição facsimilada. Lisboa:  Contexto Editora. 
 SARAIVA, António José and Óscar Lopes (1993). História da Literatura Portuguesa. Porto:  Porto Editora, 17th ed. 
 MARTINS, Fernando Cabral (coord.) (2008). Dicionário de Fernando Pessoa e do Modernismo Português. Alfragide: Editorial Caminho.

External links
 Portuguese National Library
 Orpheu at the Portuguese National Library
 Orpheu Nº1 at Gutenberg Project
 Orpheu Nº2 at Gutenberg Project

20th century in Portugal
Modernism